The 2014 Congressional election in the Northern Mariana Islands was held on November 4, 2014, to elect the territory's sole Delegate to the United States House of Representatives. Representatives and non-voting Delegates are elected for two-year terms. Incumbent Delegate Gregorio Sablan, who has held the seat since its creation in 2009, was re-elected.

The election coincided with the nationwide United States House of Representatives elections.

Candidates
Incumbent Delegate Gregorio Sablan filed for re-election. Sablan caucuses with the Democratic Party, but ran as an Independent. He was first elected in 2008, upon the creation of the Northern Mariana Islands' delegate seat for the U.S. House of Representatives.

Sablan was challenged by Democrat Andrew Sablan Salas.

Endorsements
Delegate Gregorio Sablan was endorsed by House Minority Whip Rep. Steny Hoyer (D-Maryland) in October 2014.

Results
The election was held on Tuesday, November 4, 2014.

See also
2014 United States House of Representatives elections
2014 Northern Mariana Islands general election

References

2014 Northern Mariana Islands elections
Northern Mariana Islands
2014